Sherring is a surname. Notable people with the surname include:

Billy Sherring (1877–1964), Canadian marathon runner
Frank Sherring (1914–2007), Canadian auto dealer and politician
M. A. Sherring (1826–1880), English Protestant missionary in British India and Indologist

See also
Shearing (surname)